AlBaik is a Saudi fast food restaurant chain headquartered in Jeddah, Hejaz that primarily sells broasted and fried chicken with a variety of sauces. It is Saudi Arabia's largest restaurant chain. Albaik currently has a trade name in 80 countries. 

The chain was founded by Shakour Abu Ghazalah, a Saudi entrepreneur, who began selling fried chicken in 1974. The restaurant was located on Old Airport Road in Jeddah. Albaik was registered as a trademark in Saudi Arabia in 1986. In December 2020, Albaik opened two branches in Bahrain, marking the first time the chain expanded outside of Saudi Arabia. Albaik popularized chicken in the fast-food industry, especially in the Muslim world, since it sells Halal (permissible) food.

Albaik has more than 40 branches in Jeddah where it is headquartered: ten in Mecca, eight in Medina, two in Buraydah, one in Unaizah, one in Taif, one in Yanbu, one in Riyadh, one in Al Qunfudhah, one in Al Lith, Al-Kharj and one in Al-Jubail. Recently, Albaik started expanding further into the central region of Saudi Arabia with two branches opened in Buraidah, and one in Abha and further branches planned for the city, in addition to other main cities in the region. This marked the first time the chain has expanded outside its main service area in Saudi Arabia's western provinces. Albaik was also introduced in Saudi Arabia's South Province, in the city of Jizan in 2016. As of 2019, Albaik is constructing its new branch in Al Baha. Albaik currently has over 120 locations.

History
In September 1974, a Saudi entrepreneur Shakour Abu Ghazalah, renovated an old warehouse he was renting into Saudi Arabia's first pressure fried chicken restaurant and later opened it. The restaurant was located on Old Airport Road in Jeddah. Albaik was registered as a trademark in Saudi Arabia in 1986.

The first Albaik restaurant was opened in Mecca in 1990. Albaik then began expansion by building three seasonal locations in Mina in 1998 and served pilgrims during Hajj. The company expanded to Medina in 2001. They introduced a limited menu food court concept named Albaik Express in 2002 in Diyafa Mall in Mecca. They opened the world's largest quick-service restaurant kitchen in Mina as a seasonal restaurant to serve pilgrims during Hajj in 2006. The same year, they opened a location in Yanbu City. In 2013, they opened their first express restaurant at a Sasco Petrol station on the highway road from Medina to Jeddah. 

Their first restaurant out of Hejaz was in Buraydah, Qaseem in 2015, expanding their customer's range. They opened their first branches in Jizan and Riyadh in the year 2016 and 2018 respectively. In 2019, they opened three branches in Dammam, Eastern Province, with the main one located in King Fahd International Airport and the other two in the Abdullah Fuad and Al Manar districts. On June 16, 2021, Albaik opened its first branch in The Dubai Mall, bringing its range of dishes to the United Arab Emirates for the first time. They have since opened three more branches in the UAE, with another currently under construction. 

A  food processing company was inaugurated for Aquat Food Industries - a sister company of Albaik and the main producer and supplier of its menu in 2000, effectively boosting their sales.

Programs 
In 1996, the Young Scientist program was introduced as part of Albaik and Coca-Cola's corporate social responsibility commitment towards society in association with the Jeddah Science and Technology Center. The House Hero children's education and training program were firstly introduced in 2001. In 2005, "Nazeeh & Wartan" - the Clean Up the World program for Saudi Arabia was introduced with Coca-Cola, in association with the United Nations Development Programme and Jeddah Science and Technology Center. The rate is around 12 riyals.

Products 
The 18 secret herbs and spices recipe was first developed in 1984. Variations of the Albaik chicken was first sold in 1994, with the addition of Harrag, a spicy variation of Albaik's chicken. Seafood was first included on the menu with the introduction of the jumbo shrimp in 1995 and the value shrimp in the following year.

See also
 List of fast-food chicken restaurants

References 

Al Baik is coming to Abu Dhabi

1974 establishments in Saudi Arabia
Fast-food chains of Saudi Arabia
Regional restaurant chains
Companies based in Jeddah
Restaurants established in 1974
Fast-food poultry restaurants
Saudi Arabian brands